David Nolan is an American author, civil rights activist, and historian.

Biography
Nolan was born in Cambridge, Massachusetts in 1946, the son of journalist Joseph T. Nolan and his artist wife Virginia.

He attended public schools in Bayside, New York and Waterbury, Connecticut, studied at the University of Virginia, and was active in the American Civil Rights Movement of the 1960s. 

Since 1977 he has made his home in St. Augustine, Florida, known as the "nation's oldest city." From 1978-1980 he worked on the first official survey of old buildings in the Ancient City.

His first book, Fifty Feet in Paradise: The Booming of Florida, dealing with the booms and busts in the state's colorful real estate history, was published by Harcourt Brace Jovanovich in 1984, and he received the annual author's award from the Council for Florida Libraries.

He was a contributor to a literary tour guide of the state called The Book Lover's Guide to Florida that was published by Pineapple Press in 1992.

In 1995 he collaborated with artist Jean Ellen Fitzpatrick and photographer Ken Barrett to produce The Houses of St. Augustine, which has become the bestselling book about the Ancient City and its historic buildings.

He was a founder in 2002 of ACCORD (an acronym for "Anniversary to Commemorate the Civil Rights Demonstrations"), a group designed to honor the participants in the St. Augustine movement during the Civil Rights Movement.  Demonstrations in St. Augustine in 1963 and 1964 led by Dr.Robert Hayling and Dr. Martin Luther King Jr. resulted in the passage of the landmark Civil Rights Act of 1964, one of the two great legislative accomplishments of the movement.  ACCORD has launched a permanently marked Freedom Trail of historic sites of the civil rights movement that has gained international publicity. On July 2, 2014--the fiftieth anniversary of the signing of the Civil Rights Act of 1964--ACCORD opened the first civil rights museum in Florida, at 79 Bridge Street in St. Augustine, the former dental office of Dr. Robert Hayling.

During Black History Month in 2009, Nolan received the Governor's Points of Light Award for outstanding community service.

On July 2, 2009, the 45th anniversary of the signing of the Civil Rights Act of 1964, he received the President's Volunteer Service Award from Barack Obama.

He has served as president of the Marjorie Kinnan Rawlings Society and trustee of the Fort Mose Historical Society.

He is a lecturer on historic, architectural, and literary subjects.

Works
 Nolan, David, Fifty Feet in Paradise:  The Booming of Florida,, New York: Harcourt Brace Jovanovich, 1984, 
 Nolan, David, with paintings by Jean Ellen Fitzpatrick and photographs by Ken Barrett, Jr., The Houses of St. Augustine, Sarasota: Pineapple Press, 1995, 
Summary Information
Title: David Nolan Papers
Inclusive Dates: 1960-1987

Creator:
Nolan, David, 1946-
Call Number: Mss 773; PH 3905; PH 3906

Quantity: 2.4 c.f. (6 archives boxes) and 104 photographs

Repository:
Wisconsin Historical Society, Library-Archives Division

References

External links
http://historynewsnetwork.org/article/75102
http://www.nbcnews.com/id/20463868/ns/travel-destination_travel/t/st-augustine-marking-civil-right-sites/ 
https://www.staugustine.com/news/20181230/10-who-make-difference-called-national-treasure-david-nolan-helped-shine-light-on-citys-black-history 
https://www.usatoday.com/in-depth/news/nation/2019/12/16/american-slavery-traces-roots-st-augustine-florida-not-jamestown/4205417002/
https://digital.stpetersburg.usf.edu/cgi/viewcontent.cgi?article=1039&context=forum_magazine 

1946 births
Living people
People from Bayside, Queens
University of Virginia alumni
People from Cambridge, Massachusetts
American male writers